Ischyodus (from  , 'power' and   'tooth') is an extinct genus of chimaera. It is the most diverse and long-lived chimaera genus, with over 39 species found worldwide spanning over 140 million years from the Middle Jurassic to the Miocene. Complete specimens of I. quenstedti from the Late Jurassic of Germany most closely resemble the genus Callorhinchus amongst living chimaera genera. It is sometimes placed in the "Edaphodontidae" a unclearly defined group of chimaera with an uncertain position within the clade. While other authors place it into Callorhinchidae along with Callorhinchus.

Based on complete specimen, total length is 21 times larger than mesiodistal length of mandibular tooth plate.

References

External links
Image of a ratfish, Ischyodus rayhaasi, mandible

Prehistoric cartilaginous fish genera
Jurassic cartilaginous fish
Cretaceous cartilaginous fish
Paleocene fish
Prehistoric fish of Europe
Prehistoric fish of Australia
Prehistoric fish of North America
Mooreville Chalk
Chimaeriformes